"Simple Man" is a song by Australian rock-pop band Noiseworks. It was released in May 1989 as the third single from their second studio album Touch (1988) and peaked at number 47 on the ARIA singles chart.

Track listing
7" vinyl / CD single (654845 7)

12" vinyl / European CD maxi (654845 8)

Charts

External links
 https://www.discogs.com/Noiseworks-Simple-Man/master/394034

References

Noiseworks songs
1988 songs
1989 singles
CBS Records singles
Songs written by Jon Stevens